Melanopolia is a genus of longhorn beetles of the subfamily Lamiinae, containing the following species:

subgenus Melanopolia
 Melanopolia brevicornis Dillon & Dillon, 1959
 Melanopolia catori Jordan, 1903
 Melanopolia cincta Jordan, 1903
 Melanopolia cotytta Dillon & Dillon, 1959
 Melanopolia frenata Bates, 1884
 Melanopolia freundei Dillon & Dillon, 1959
 Melanopolia ligondesi Lepesme, 1952
 Melanopolia longiscapa Breuning, 1935
 Melanopolia lysida Dillon & Dillon, 1959
 Melanopolia ruficornis Breuning, 1955

subgenus Pellamnia
 Melanopolia convexa Bates, 1884
 Melanopolia gripha (Jordan, 1894)

References

Lamiini